Colobometra is a genus of echinoderms.

References

Colobometridae
Animals described in 1909
Crinoid genera